Submarines of the United States Navy are built in classes, using a single design for a number of boats. Minor variations occur as improvements are incorporated into the design, so later boats of a class may be more capable than earlier. Also, boats are modified, sometimes extensively, while in service, creating departures from the class standard. However, in general, all boats of a class are noticeably similar.

In this list such single boat "classes" are marked with "(unique)".

Pre–World War I

World War I

Interwar

World War II

Cold War

Diesel-Electric Submarines (SSs, SSKs, and SSGs)

Nuclear Attack Submarines (SSNs)

Nuclear Cruise Missile Submarines (SSGNs)

Nuclear Ballistic Missile Submarines (SSBNs)

Deep-submergence vehicles (DSVs)

Miscellaneous Submarines (SSTs, SSRs, AGSSs & SSRNs)

Post–Cold War

See also
Submarines in the United States Navy
List of submarines of the United States Navy
 List of Gato class submarines
 List of Balao class submarines
 List of Tench class submarines
 List of Sturgeon class submarines
 List of Los Angeles class submarines
 List of most successful American submarines in World War II
 Allied submarines in the Pacific War
 List of submarines of the Second World War
 List of ship classes of the Second World War
 List of United States Navy ships

External Links
youtube.com USS Holland 
youtube.com Submarine #1

References

External links
 
 

 
 
Submarine classes
United States Navy